Xianghu is a terminus station on Line 1 of the Hangzhou Metro in China. Xianghu is known as West Lake's "sister Lake" and is located in Xiaoshan District of Hangzhou, Zhejiang. Attractions at Xianghu include the Kuahu bridge cultural site, the world's oldest canoe, and the site of Wangcheng, an ancient military site. It was opened in November 2012, together with the rest of the stations on Line 1.

References

Railway stations in Zhejiang
Railway stations in China opened in 2012
Hangzhou Metro stations